The Enemies EP is the debut release by United States indie rock band Headlights.  It was released by the Polyvinyl Record Company in 2004. The song "Everybody Needs a Fence to Lean On" was featured in the Grey's Anatomy season two episode "Yesterday."

Track listing
 "Tokyo" (3:38)
 "Centuries" (2:36)
 "Everybody Needs a Fence to Lean On" (4:13)
 "It Isn't Easy to Live That Well" (4:01)

2004 EPs
Headlights (band) albums
Polyvinyl Record Co. EPs